The New York City mayoral election of 1961 occurred on Tuesday, November 7, 1961. Incumbent Democratic Mayor Robert F. Wagner, Jr. won a decisive re-election victory for a third term in office. Wagner defeated the Republican nominee, state Attorney General Louis J. Lefkowitz, and the Citizens Party nominee, New York City Comptroller Lawrence E. Gerosa. Wagner received 51.03% of the vote to Lefkowitz's 34.46%, a Democratic victory margin of 16.57%.

Gerosa, running with the short-lived "pro-taxpayer" Citizens Party, billed himself as the "real Democrat" in the race, and took many Democratic votes, finishing relatively strongly for a third party candidate.

Wagner won decisive majorities in Manhattan, Brooklyn, and the Bronx, and won a plurality in Queens. Lefkowitz eked out a narrow 1-point plurality win in Staten Island.

Wagner was also the nominee of the Liberal Party, and additionally ran on the Brotherhood ballot line. Lefkowitz also ran on the Nonpartisan and Civic Action ballot lines, while Gerosa also ran on the Independent ballot line.

After being supported by the Tammany Hall machine in his 1953 and 1957 elections, Wagner broke with Tammany Hall in 1961, defeating the Democratic Party power brokers' chosen candidate, Arthur Levitt, in the Democratic primary and then going on to win a third term in the general election. Wagner's victory thus ultimately signified the decline of the power of political machines in New York City.

Wagner was sworn into his third and final term in January 1962.

Democratic primary
Incumbent Mayor Robert F. Wagner Jr. had strong ties to the Tammany Hall organization, which had been headed by Carmine DeSapio since 1949. By 1960, Wagner realized that maintaining these ties with Tammany Hall was a potential liability. In January 1961, tensions with DeSapio and Tammany Hall came to a head when Manhattan Borough president Hulan Jack was automatically removed from his position after being convicted of having a friend attempt to curry favor by paying for a renovation to Jack's apartment. The vacant Borough president post was to be filled by a vote of Manhattan's six City Council members but historically, the selection was made by Tammany Hall and the councilmen followed Tammany Hall's lead. Rather than cooperate with DeSapio to select a new Borough president, Wagner refused to speak with DeSapio in hopes of forcing DeSapio to make a selection of a candidate, which would allow Wagner to select a different candidate and signal his independence from Tammany Hall. Wagner's choice was state Supreme Court Justice Edward R. Dudley while DeSapio selected an old opponent, Assemblyman Lloyd Dickens. Dudley was ultimately elected by a vote of Manhattan's six Councilmen, but only after two of the pro-Tammany Councilmen had been called into meetings with Louis Kaplan, the city Commissioner of Investigation, who leveraged his powers to ensure the two Councilmen voted for the Mayor's candidate.

The final break occurred in early February when Wagner publicly called for DeSapio to stand down from his position as the New York County Democratic Party. During the period prior to the break between Wagner and Tammany Hall, Wagner had courted the Liberal Party. The Liberals won few elections outright but were able to provide votes to allow Kennedy to carry New York for President in 1960 and still had an automatic line on the ballot. Just before February, Wagner was assured by Liberal leader Alex Rose that even if he lost the Democratic nomination, he would receive the Liberal nomination and have a chance to win the general election. In addition to the Liberals, Wagner sought the support of reformist Democrats. In January, 1961, Wagner spoke with former Governor and Senator Herbert H. Lehman and other high-ranking members of the reformist Committee for Democratic Voters (CDV) After meeting, it became clear that Lehman would support Wagner against Tammany.

In March, Wagner received the results of a poll from Louis Harris showing his support among different ethnic groups in the city. Polling showed Wagner to be personally popular African-Americans and Puerto Ricans, who made up about 20% of New York's total population. Both groups would be solid in support of Wagner both in the primary and against the Republicans in the general election. Jews were also strong in their support of Wagner, with the poll indicating 70% would back Wagner against the Republicans, though only 56% would vote Democratic against a Jewish Republican nominee. African-Americans, Puerto Ricans, and Jews were deemed by Harris to be essential to Wagner's campaign. Wagner's position was much more tenuous among Catholic Irish and Italian voters, who were generally against the Mayor and would be hard to capture. 

On June 30th, two days after the Liberals voted to endorse Wagner, Tammany's candidate declared. To challenge Wagner, Tammany had selected State Comptroller Arthur Levitt Sr., who was the only Democrat to win statewide in a heavily Republican year. The Jewish Levitt was selected in hopes of winning back Jewish voters from Wagner's side. Levitt was an unlikely choice, having stated in late summer that he expected Wagner to be the nominee, but a concerted push by Tamanny made Levitt give in and agree to challenge Wagner.

Liberal party selection
Businessman Stuart Scheftel, chairman of the Liberal Party Commission At Large, announced his candidacy on May 3rd. Scheftel centered his campaign around opposition to a Democratic mayor, saying "I am convinced no Democrat can ever be a good Mayor because of his relations with political machines." and claimed that under Wagner's administration, "crookery" had reached levels unseen in previous administrations. Scheftel held no elected office at the time of his announcement, but had previously run as a Republican for Congress in the 14th district and later chaired the Draft Eisenhower for President Committee in 1948. Scheftel stated he would withdraw from the race for only three men: Senator Jacob Javits and Councilman Stanley M. Isaacs, both Republicans, or lawyer Adolf A. Berle, a Liberal.

The Liberals held a on June 28th to make their selection. From the beginning, it was clear that the party would endorse Wagner. Scheftel's name was placed into nomination but ultimately delegates voted 378 to 28 to endorse Wagner for Mayor. Scheftel made allegations that delegates, many of whom were union members, were intimidated by the presence of union leaders seated on a dais during the convention, with the leaders able to see how delegates voted because votes were conducted by the raising of hands. After his defeat, Scheftel vowed to continue his campaign and he sought to make the ballot for the September 7th primary. Because of a mistake while collecting signatures to make the ballot, Scheftel withdrew from the race in the early August, criticizing all candidates in the race.

Republican primary

Results

Results by borough

References

Mayoral election, 1961
1961
New York City mayoral
New York